Tappuah is the Hebrew word for "apple" and also a biblical name with several meanings:

Taffuh, a town in the West Bank 4 miles west of Hebron, the suggested location for the ancient town called Tappuah mentioned in the Second Book of Kings
Entappuah, mentioned in the Book of Joshua, probably a spring near Yasuf
Tappuah, mentioned in 1 Chronicles 2:43 as one of the four sons of Hebron
Tappuah, a town bordering Ephraim and conquered by Manasseh